Jitender Singh Malik (born 12 February 1970) is an Indian politician and a former Member of Parliament of India from Sonepat. Before elected to parliament, he was two term member of Legislative assembly from Kailana now Ganaur in Haryana 2000-2009. In 2009 general elections, he defeated three times sitting MP Chaudhary Kishan Singh Sangwan of Bharatiya Janata Party (BJP).

Early life
Jitender Singh Malik was born to Chaudhary Rajinder Singh and Smt. Dhanapati Malik at the Bhigan village in Sonepat district of Haryana. His father Chaudhary Rajinder Singh was a Minister in Haryana Government and his grandfather Chaudhary Lahri Singh (Malik) was former MP (3rd Lok Sabha 1962-67) from Rohtak constituency and Minister in Punjab Government from 1946 to 1955. Though a renowned politician and an associate of Sir Chhotu Ram, by profession he was an advocate in pre-Independence era.

References

Living people
Indian National Congress politicians
India MPs 2009–2014
People from Sonipat district
1970 births
Lok Sabha members from Haryana